Clepsysaurus (from  , 'water thief' and  , 'lizard') is a dubious genus of extinct archosaur described by Isaac Lea in 1851 from remains discovered in the Carnian Passaic Formation of Lehigh County, Pennsylvania. Two species are known: C. pennsylvanicus (the type species) and C. veatleianus. The holotype of C. pennsylvanicus, ANSP 9526, 9555-71, 9594-5, consists of teeth, ribs and vertebrae, while the holotype of C. veatleianus, AMNH 2331, consists of a single tooth, with AMNH 2330, a tooth, as a referred specimen. Other specimens of C. pennsylvanicus are known, including ANSP 15071 (a left anterior dentary with 23 teeth, a right dentary with 30 teeth and a portion of the right temporal region) and AMNH 2337 (a single tooth).

Clepsysaurus was traditionally classed as a sauropodomorph, but more recent studies indicate that it was either a dubious basal archosaur or a member of the Phytosauria. Clepsysaurus was eventually seen as a synonym of either the dubious archosaur Palaeosaurus or the sauropodomorph Anchisaurus, but Clepsysaurus was eventually resurrected as a valid, but dubious, genus.

Gallery

References

Fossil taxa described in 1851
Triassic archosaurs
Nomina dubia
Taxa named by Isaac Lea